Before I Say Goodbye is a book by Ruth Picardie. Compiled and edited by her sister and husband, it uses Picardie's newspaper columns and correspondence to tell the story of her life with breast cancer, to which she succumbed in September 1997.

References from other works
In her 1999 autobiography If Only, Geri Halliwell says she was reading Before I Say Goodbye round about the time she left the Spice Girls.

British non-fiction books
Breast cancer
Books about cancer
English non-fiction books